

Coffee Meets Bagel is a San Francisco–based dating and social networking service.

History
Coffee Meets Bagel was created by three sisters: Arum, Dawoon, and Soo Kang. Arum first had the idea for the app in 2011, and the sisters launched the app in New York City on April 17, 2012. Coffee Meets Bagel then launched in Boston on May 10, 2012 and in San Francisco on October 24, 2012.

In September 2012, the company announced that it had raised seed funding of $600,000 led by Lightbank, with Match.com co-founder Peng T. Ong also investing.

In January 2015, Coffee Meets Bagel was featured on Shark Tank, where the sisters sought a $500,000 investment in exchange for 5% of the company. They did not make a deal with any of the sharks, notably turning down Mark Cuban's hypothetical offer of $30 million to buy the entire company.

In February 2015, the company announced a $7.8 million Series A financing round led by existing investor DCM Ventures.

In May 2018, the company raised $12 million in Series B funding led by Atami Capital.

User personal data breach
In February 2019, Coffee Meets Bagel acknowledged that an attacker had stolen "a partial list of user details, specifically names and email addresses", between late 2017 and mid-2018. Outside reporting indicated that as many as 6,174,513 accounts may have been affected, and that other details including age and gender may have been taken as well.

Features 
Features of the Coffee Meets Bagel app include limiting the number of profiles users can interact with each day and offering ice-breaker information for matches. In 2020, Coffee Meets Bagel added video virtual speed dating in response to the COVID-19 pandemic.

See also
 Comparison of online dating websites

References

External links
 

Android (operating system) software
IAC (company)
IOS software
Mobile social software
Multilingual websites
Online dating services of the United States
American social networking websites